Walter Archibald Annan (23 March 1877 – 23 January 1949) was a Scottish professional footballer in the years prior to World War I. A full back, he made over 170 appearances in the English Football League. He featured prominently in Bristol City's successes in the first decade of the 20th century under manager Harry Thickitt. He also played for Sunderland, Sheffield United, and Burslem Port Vale. He helped Bristol City to the Second Division title in 1905–06, a second-place finish in the First Division in 1906–07, and also played in the FA Cup final in 1909.

Playing career

Early career
Born in Carnwath, Lanarkshire, he was the youngest of 13 children born to Walter Annan, a colliery manager, and his wife Marion (née Storry). A lifelong teetotaller, Annan joined local club West Calder in August 1899, before moving onto Edinburgh club St Bernard's in May 1900. No Scottish league appearances are recorded for either club. In April 1902 he moved to Sunderland in the First Division of the English Football League. He made a solitary appearance at right back in 2–1 win over Notts County on 4 April 1903, in a season when Sunderland finished third, only a single point behind champions Sheffield Wednesday. In January 1904 he moved on to Sheffield United, and made his league debut for the "Blades" at left back in a 2–0 defeat at Everton on 9 January 1904. He made a total of nine appearances at full back, deputising for Harry Thickitt and Boyle in 1903–04. Annan made 18 appearances in 1904–05, as United finished sixth in the First Division.

Bristol City
Annan followed manager Harry Thickitt to Ashton Gate for £200 in April 1905. When Bristol City finished as Second Division champions in 1905–06, Annan was ever-present with 38 appearances at right-back, and formed a notable defensive full back partnership with Joe Cottle. Ever present again for a second successive season in 1906–07, City finished the campaign as runners-up in the First Division. Annan played just 13 games in 1907–08 as new signing Bob Young was preferred at right-back. In 1908–09, Annan replaced Young as the regular right-back, making 26 appearances and playing in all 10 FA Cup ties, including the 1909 FA Cup Final – City lost the final 1–0 to Manchester United at Crystal Palace. He made a further 28 appearances in 1909–10, and was again replaced by Bob Young in the later stages of the season. Annan did not feature in the City team in the 1910–11 season, as Bristol City were relegated back to the Second Division. The final league match of the season, a 1–0 defeat to Everton on 29 April 1911, was awarded as a joint benefit for Arthur Spear and Archie Annan, although neither played in the game.

Burslem Port Vale
In July 1911, Annan moved onto Burslem Port Vale. He made his debut at the Athletic Ground in a 1–0 win over Oldham Athletic Reserves on 4 September, but injured himself in a match against Crewe Alexandra twelve days later. He failed to hold onto his first team place upon his recovery, and was released at the end of the 1911–12 season, after picking up a Central League runners-up medal.

Managerial career
Annan was appointed manager of Welsh Southern Football League club Mid Rhondda in July 1911, where he was assisted by former Bristol City colleagues Joe Cottle and Bill Demmery. He subsequently returned to Bristol City in March 1921 and spent five years as coach at the club. He was later a police constable stationed at St George in Bristol.

Career statistics
Source:

Honours
Bristol City
Football League Second Division: 1905–06
FA Cup runner-up: 1909

References

1877 births
1949 deaths
People from Bathgate
Footballers from West Lothian
Scottish footballers
Association football fullbacks
St Bernard's F.C. players
Sheffield United F.C. players
Bristol City F.C. players
Sunderland A.F.C. players
Port Vale F.C. players
English Football League players
Scottish football managers
Southern Football League managers
Association football coaches
Scottish police officers
FA Cup Final players
Officers in English police forces